Two Swordfish-class destroyers served with the Royal Navy.   and  were both built by Armstrong Whitworth at Elswick, Tyne and Wear launching in 1895.  Fitted with Yarrow boilers, they could make 27 knots and were armed with one twelve pounder and two torpedo tubes.

Requirement
After ordering six prototype torpedo boat destroyers from the specialist torpedo boat yards Yarrows, Thornycroft and Laird as part of the 1892–1893 shipbuilding programme, the British Admiralty planned to buy larger numbers of destroyers under the 1893–1894 programme, with orders being spread over more shipyards. The Admiralty specified a number of broad requirement, leaving the detailed design of the ships and their machinery to the builders. A turtleback forecastle was to be fitted. Armament was to vary depending on whether the ship was to be used in the torpedo boat or gunboat role. As a torpedo boat, the planned armament was a single QF 12 pounder 12 cwt ( calibre) gun, together with a secondary gun armament of three 6-pounder guns, and two 18 inch (450 mm) torpedo tubes. As a gunboat, one of the torpedo tubes could be removed to accommodate a further two six-pounders.

On 8 December 1893, the Admiralty placed an order for a single 27-knotter destroyer (Swordfish) with Armstrong Mitchell & Co with an order for a second destroyer (Spitfire) following on 7 February 1894. The ships' machinery was to be supplied by Belliss & Co of Birmingham. Three widely spaced funnels were fitted, with the middle funnel being fatter than the other two as it handled the uptakes from four boilers rather than two as did the other funnels.

Both ships had been sold for scrapping before 1913 when the Admiralty re-classed the surviving 27-knotter destroyers as the A Class.

See also
A-class destroyer (1913)

Citations

Bibliography
 

 

Destroyer classes
Ship classes of the Royal Navy